Cybex International (NASDAQ: CYBI) is an American fitness equipment manufacturer for commercial and consumer use. They produce mainly cardiovascular and strength equipment such as Arc Trainers, treadmills, stationary bicycles and steppers. Cybex markets their products through distributors in over 87 countries. The company has over 600 employees and their products are manufactured in their two manufacturing facilities, located in Franklin Park, Illinois, and Owatonna, Minnesota.

History
Cybex International was founded in the late 60's as "The Cybex Ergometer Company" in Ronkonkoma, New York. It was acquired by Lumex, which was traded publicly on the American Stock Exchange. At that time, they manufactured isokinetic rehabilitation equipment. In 1995, Lumex sold its medical supply business and changed its name to Cybex (AMEX: CYB). In May 1997, Cybex merged with Trotter, Inc, primarily a manufacturer of treadmills, whose manufacturing facility was located in Medway. In this merger, UM Holdings, the owner of Trotter, Inc, gained 51% of Cybex's interests and publicly traded the company. In 1998, Cybex acquired Tectrix, a California-based manufacturer of primarily bikes and steppers; the production of which was moved to Cybex's manufacturing facility in Medway. Cybex acquired direct sales and distribution in the United Kingdom by its 2001 acquisition of Forza. Arc Trainer is their most recent product.

Acquisition by Life Fitness 
As of January 20, 2016, Cybex International, Inc. was purchased by Brunswick Corporation for $195 million. As part of this purchase, Cybex is to join the Life Fitness portfolio of fitness brands along with Life Fitness, Hammer Strength, InMovement, SciFIT, and Indoor Cycling Group (ICG).

Closure of Medway, MA Manufacturing Facility 
As part of the integration process for Cybex International, Inc. and Brunswick Corporation/Life Fitness, the Medway, MA manufacturing facility, which employs approximately 150 people, will be shut down effective September 30, 2017. Component fabrication and engineering will be moved to other  locations, including the Cybex location in Owatonna, MN, Franklin Park, IL, and Rosemont, IL.

References

External links

Parent company website
Used Gybex Machines

Exercise equipment companies
Manufacturing companies based in Illinois
Rosemont, Illinois
Companies based in Cook County, Illinois
2016 mergers and acquisitions
2019 mergers and acquisitions
Brunswick Corporation